The Church of Saint-Arige-et-Saint-Vincent-de-Saragosse de Péone is a Catholic church located within the municipality of Péone, in the French department of Alpes-Maritimes.

The building was registered as a monument historique on November 29, 1948.

History 
The first church was built in the 11th century.

The church was transformed and rebuilt in 1761 following the plans of the architect Pietro Antonio Santo Bartolomeo, a master Italian mason born in Lugano, Switzerland.

There remains from the previous building a lintel of a door engraved with the date 1550 and two lateral chapels covered by ogive arches, which were parts of the old nave whose central element disappeared during the transformation.

Architecture 
The church was built following a Greek cross plan. At the crossing of the transept, the church is surmounted by a hexagonal cupola, topped with a square lantern.

All of the interior decor, stucco, altarpieces, and paintings are in the Baroque style.

References

Bibliography 
 Philippe de Beauchamp, L'art religieux dans les Alpes-Maritimes, p. 95, Édisud, Aix-en-Provence, 1990

External links  
 DRAC PACA - Banque d'images : Église paroissiale Saint-Vincent de Saragosse
 CG06 : Église Saint-Vincent-de-Saragosse

Roman Catholic churches in France